An American Pickle is a 2020 American comedy-drama film directed by Brandon Trost (in his solo directorial debut) and written by Simon Rich, based on his 2013 short story "Sell Out". The film stars Seth Rogen as an Eastern European Jewish immigrant who gets preserved in a vat of pickles and wakes up a century later in modern-day New York City, attempting to fit in with the assistance of his last remaining descendant (also played by Rogen).

Originally intended to be released by Sony Pictures, the film's rights were sold to Warner Bros. in April 2020. It was digitally released in the United States on August 6, 2020, the first original film released by HBO Max, and theatrically in the United Kingdom the following day. The film received generally positive reviews from critics, with Rogen's dual performance being praised. It later received release on video on demand for rental and purchase.

Plot
Herschel Greenbaum and wife, Sarah, are struggling Jewish laborers from Eastern Europe. They emigrate from their shtetl to America in 1919, after their village is rampaged by Russian Cossacks. He finds a job at a pickle factory and saves up for two graves at a Jewish cemetery. One day, while working, he falls into a vat of pickles just as the factory is closed for health reasons, leaving Herschel brined for 100 years.

Waking up in Brooklyn in 2019, Herschel discovers that his only living relative is his great-grandson Ben. Ben works as a freelance app developer and is currently developing an app "Boop Bop", a service that checks companies' ethics when buying their products. Ben reluctantly agrees to go with Herschel to the cemetery where Sarah and his son along with Ben's parents are buried. Herschel is disgusted to find the cemetery is in shambles with a Russian vodka billboard overlooking it. This causes him to assault construction workers putting up the billboard, leading to his and Ben's arrest.

Ben bails them out of jail; however, he finds that he can't get investors for his app due to his new criminal record, so he disowns Herschel. Herschel decides to begin a pickle business to buy and take down the billboard overlooking the cemetery. Herschel is a huge success over social media. However, Ben tells health inspectors that Herschel has been using produce found in the trash bins, causing him to be fined $12,000. Herschel is able to come back from this with the assistance of unpaid interns, causing his business to become even more popular and allowing him to refurbish the cemetery and remove the billboard. Herschel's success leads to Ben envying him even more.

Ben then tells Herschel to download Twitter, and he begins tweeting controversial statements. While initially met with protests and boycotts, Herschel is then seen as an icon of free speech and empowerment. While Herschel is hosting a friendly debate, Ben shows up and questions his thoughts on Christianity. This leads to a rant, causing the public to despise him. The government attempts to deport him after his immigration files can not be located.

Herschel arrives at Ben's, and Ben reluctantly agrees to help him get to the Canadian border. Through this, Ben and Herschel begin to reconcile their relationship. However, Ben admits that he tried to sabotage Herschel's business, causing Herschel to admit that he is disappointed that Ben is more committed to his app than his family's legacy, leading to a physical fight between them. Herschel steals Ben's backpack, and uses his razor to shave and puts on his clothes to pose as Ben, alerting the police that the real Ben is Herschel. This causes the real Ben's arrest and deportation.

In Ben's apartment, Herschel discovers that the app's name, "Boop Bop", was actually the nickname Ben gave his late parents, leading Herschel to realize that family was always in Ben's heart. He returns to his home country to find Ben, who is staying at a local synagogue. They reconcile, and some time later return to Brooklyn, hoping to develop a pickle-selling website.

Cast

Production
Seth Rogen and Simon Rich began to discuss the idea for the film as early as 2007. On May 29, 2013, it was announced that Sony Pictures had acquired the screen rights to the short story "Sell Out" by Rich. Producers were set to consist of Rogen, Evan Goldberg, and James Weaver, while Rich was expected to serve as an executive producer. Production companies involved with the film were slated to include Point Grey Pictures.

On September 27, 2018, it was announced that Brandon Trost was attached to direct the film, after working as director of photography in numerous films starring Seth Rogen, and that Rich would write the film, while additional producers included Alexandria McAtee.

Alongside the directing announcement, it was confirmed that the film would star Rogen. On November 26, 2018, it was announced that Maya Erskine, Sarah Snook, Eliot Glazer, Kalen Allen, Molly Evensen, and Kevin O'Rourke had joined the cast (although Erskine ultimately did not appear in the film). Principal photography took place in Pittsburgh, Pennsylvania from October 29 to December 22, 2018. In an interview with Corridor Digital, Rogen revealed that they spent a month shooting his scenes as Herschel before shooting his scenes as Ben, as he wanted Herschel's beard to be authentic.

Music
The music was composed by Nami Melumad and Michael Giacchino wrote the themes for the film, including a suite titled "Pickles, Suite or Sour."

Release
On April 27, 2020, it was announced Warner Bros. had acquired worldwide distribution rights to the film from Sony Pictures. It was digitally released in the United States on HBO Max and Canada on VOD partner Crave on August 6, 2020. In November, Variety reported the film was the 20th-most watched straight-to-streaming title of 2020 up to that point.

The film was theatrically shown in the United Kingdom on August 7, 2020. It made $36,194 from 162 theaters in its UK debut, finishing fourth at the box office. The film also screened in Israel as part of the Jerusalem Film Festival. The film was removed from HBO Max in August 2022 but remained on Amazon Prime Video.

Reception
The website's critics consensus reads, "An American Pickle lacks the tart snap viewers might expect given its creative premise, but Seth Rogen's dual performance makes this a low-key comedy to relish." On Metacritic, the film has a weighted average score of 58 out of 100, based on 39 critics, indicating "mixed or average reviews".

Writing for The Hollywood Reporter, David Rooney said: "An American Pickle is neither the most substantial nor the most sophisticated comedy, but its soulful sweetness outweighs its flaws." Barry Hertz of The Globe and Mail gave the film three out of four stars and wrote: "[Rogen] also manages to make the film's har-har dual-role conceit work beyond mere shtick. There is Herschel, and there is Ben, and Rogen plays each one of them with a decidedly unique energy. Meanwhile, director Brandon Trost, a longtime cinematographer for such Rogen films as Neighbors and The Interview, makes the mensch-on-mensch action seem as real as can be."

Owen Gleiberman of Variety called the film "too cantankerous to be funny and too preposterous to believe" and wrote that "An American Pickle, in its ethnically satirical and scattered way, lacks the integrity of its own ridiculousness. It's pungent but flavorless: an unkosher dill."

References

External links
 
 
 

2020 films
2020 comedy-drama films
2020s English-language films
American comedy-drama films
Films about immigration to the United States
Films about Jews and Judaism
Films based on American short stories
Films produced by Evan Goldberg
Films produced by Seth Rogen
Films scored by Nami Melumad
Films set in 1919
Films set in 2019
Films set in Brooklyn
Films shot in Pittsburgh
HBO Max films
Point Grey Pictures films
Rip Van Winkle-type stories
Adaptations of works by Simon Rich
Works by Simon Rich
2020s American films